Daniel Blesa (born January 6, 1979), better known by the stage name Supremme de Luxe, is a Spanish actor, singer, cabaret artist, drag queen and television personality based in Madrid. 

De Luxe was known across Spain for her theatrical, musical and cabaret performances before rising to international attention as the host and head judge of Drag Race España, the Spanish adaptation of RuPaul's Drag Race. She has subsequently appeared as the presenter of the Drag Race España stage show Gran Hotel de las Reinas and as co-host of Reinas al Rescate, an Atresmedia reality docuseries in which four drag queens support and bring visibility to members of the LGBTQ community living in rural parts of Spain.

Early life 
Blesa was born and raised in Fuenlabrada in the Community of Madrid. He started acting in local theatre at age 13.

As a child, Blesa wanted to be either an actor or a language and literature teacher. He started a degree in Spanish Language and Literature which he is currently finishing at the National University of Distance Education following a suspension of studies to focus on his acting career.

Career 
Blesa began acting professionally in 1994, specialising in theatrical performance. He has also been involved in a number of acting and writing projects in film, television and radio, and has taught youth theatre and cabaret performance.

Blesa's drag persona Supremme de Luxe was born on 20 December 1997 in Madrid, where she made a name for herself with almost daily performances in the bars and clubs of the Chueca district. Her club night ¡Que trabaje Rita! has helped shape the Madrid drag scene over the last decade, and has experienced wider success in Barcelona, Mexico and Paris. De Luxe has participated in all Madrid Pride parades since 2000, as well as in EuroPride 2007 and WorldPride 2017. She has hosted numerous events such as the Alcorcón Drag Queen Gala, Bakala.org's anniversary celebrations, the Bésametonto Awards, Mr. Bear Madrid/Mr. Bear España, and the International Gay and Lesbian Film Festival, as well as corporate events for brands like Red Bull and Ballantines. De Luxe's work references that of Spanish and international film actresses, and draws particular inspiration from Concha Velasco, Lola Herrera, Nacha Guevara, Liza Minnelli and Bette Midler. The name Supremme is a tribute to the American singer Diana Ross and her girl-group The Supremes. Years later, she was referred to as de Luxe by an acquaintance. The name stuck and she has grown to like it after being unsure of it initially.

De Luxe began releasing music in 2012. Her style is primarily 80s electropop, inspired by Blesa's favourite musical era. Her 2013 single "Miénteme" featured as part of the official soundtrack for WorldPride 2017.

De Luxe has appeared in two films directed by Luis Navarrete, a short film Daddy Dearest (2018) and a feature film The Phantom of the Sauna (2021). She has featured as a celebrity guest on Pasapalabra, and appears alongside Venedita von Dash and Lara Sajen on a special Pride edition of First Dates.

In 2021, it was announced that de Luxe would serve as the host and main judge of Drag Race España, with Ana Locking, Javier Ambrossi and Javier Calvo also on the judging panel. At the time of casting, de Luxe was receiving financial aid from the Spanish government scheme that supported self-employed workers during the coronavirus pandemic. Now hailed as the best-rated international version of RuPaul’s Drag Race on IMDb, Drag Race España and its sister stage show Gran Hotel de las Reinas are in their second season. The show has been renewed for a third season due to air in 2023, and an All Stars edition has been also announced.

2022 saw the launch of Reinas al Rescate, an Atresmedia series co-hosted by de Luxe and Drag Race España contestants Estrella Xtravaganza, Pupi Poisson, and Sharonne. In the series, the four drag queens travel across rural parts of Spain to hear the experiences of LGBTQ community members who live outside big cities, share their stories, and organise local drag events to raise awareness of LGBTQ issues.

Personal life 
De Luxe declared herself a conscientious objector from military service in the Spanish Army at age 18.

Her favourite contestants from the American RuPaul's Drag Race franchise have been Bianca Del Rio, Brooke Lynn Hytes and Adore Delano.

Discography

Albums 

 Ahora Yo (2012)

Singles 

  ¡Que Trabaje Rita! (2013, with La Prohibida, Rita Team & Asanza)
 Miénteme (2013)
 Perdiste Ya el Control (2014)
 Basta Ya (2015)
 Candy Shop (2015)
 Ener-G (2016)
 Gettin' High (2016)
 Fiebre 2017 (2017)
 No Sabe a Nada 2018 (2018)
 Poco Hombre para Mí (2018)
 Resurgiré (2019)
 Llévame al Cielo (2021)
 Inevitable (2022)

Filmography

Film

Television

Theatre

References 

1978 births
Living people
Drag Race España
People from Fuenlabrada
People from Madrid
Spanish drag queens